The 2017–18 season was F.C. Motagua's 71st season in existence and the club's 52nd consecutive season in the top fight of Honduran football.  As winners of both Apertura and Clausura last season, the club was looking for their 16th and 17th league title.  They also competed for the 2017 Honduran Supercup and the 2018 CONCACAF Champions League.  No Honduran Cup competition was scheduled from the Federation this season.

Overview
Coach Diego Vásquez lead the team for his 8th consecutive tournament.  Due to the incidents occurred on last season's final match where four people lost their lives, the Discipline Commission decided to ban the Estadio Tiburcio Carías Andino for nine games.  This implied the entire home schedule for the Apertura regular season.  The penalty was later reduced to five games after an appeal.  On 1 June, Brazilian superstar Ronaldinho announced in a video through his social media that he would be visiting Honduras in July to play an exhibition match between the contenders of the Honduran Superclásico.  It was announced later however, that the match was changed to be played against Real C.D. España instead.  Decision taken to avoid a conflict between the two Barra bravas which are known for their fierce and often dangerous rivalry.  On 30 July, Ronaldinho played in front of thousands at Estadio Tiburcio Carías Andino wearing both teams' jerseys on each half.  He generated the two assists that gave a historic 0–2 win to Real España.  The game served also as a farewell to Amado Guevara, a club's longtime prominent figure.  On 2 August, Motagua defeated C.D. Marathón 2–1 at Estadio Francisco Morazán to obtain the 2017 Honduran Supercup.  On 31 December, Uruguayan newspaper Ovación selected the best clubs, the best players and the best coaches in the American leagues for 2017.  For Honduras, Motagua, Román Castillo and Diego Vásquez were all chosen

Motagua started the Apertura tournament playing outside Tegucigalpa due to the suspension of their stadium because of the incidents occurred last season.  On 9 September, Estadio Emilio Williams Agasse, a newly opened venue in Choluteca, hosted a league match for the first time in the 1–1 against Olimpia, in another edition of the Superclásico.  On 23 November, the club finished in second position and advanced directly to the semifinals.  Once in the semifinals, the club faced city neighbors Olimpia, being the 11th time in league history that these two meet at this stage.  With a 3–3 aggregate score, Motagua advanced thanks to their better regular season record over Olimpia.  The final series were played against Real España and the club failed in obtaining their third straight league title.

In the Clausura tournament, Motagua started with an away victory against Lobos UPNFM at Estadio Emilio Williams Agasse.  Just like in the Apertura, Motagua had to play their first couple of games outside their ground; this time because of the events taking place at Estadio Tiburcio Carías Andino for the new presidential term.  On 28 March, the Argentinian midfielder Santiago Vergara died from leukemia at the age of 26.  After completing the 18 regular season rounds, the team finished 2nd and qualified directly to the semifinals for their 8th consecutive time and their 26th overall.  In the semifinals, the team faced city neighbors Olimpia for another Honduran Superclásico meeting.  Motagua, once again, managed to eliminate their bitter rivals and advanced to their 4th consecutive final for the first time in their league history.  On 19 May, after a 1–1 aggregate score against C.D. Marathón, the championship had to be decided in penalty shoot-outs.  Marcelo Pereira and Reinieri Mayorquín missed their chances and the club lost the title.  With two finals reached in the 2017–18 season, Motagua qualified to the 2018 CONCACAF League.

Kits
The 2017–18 home, away and third kits were published on 22 July.

Players

Transfers in

Transfers out

Squad
 Statistics as of 19 May 2018
 Only league matches into account

Goalkeeper's action
 As of 19 May 2018

Results
All times are local CST unless stated otherwise

Preseason and friendlies

Apertura

Clausura

Honduran Supercup

CONCACAF Champions League

By round

Statistics
 As of 19 May 2018

External links
 Official website

References

F.C. Motagua seasons
Motagua
Motagua